China's National Highway 107 runs from Beijing to Hong Kong SAR via Wuhan. It runs to approximately 2,698 km, and, on a map, runs broadly on a straight line from Beijing to Shenzhen. In 2013, under a new 2013-2030 plan by the National Development and Reform Commission and the Ministry of Transport, the G107 has been extended to Hong Kong.

In between, the highway runs parallel to national highways 105 and 106.

Route and distance

See also
 China National Highways
 AH1

107
Road transport in Beijing
Transport in Hebei
Transport in Henan
Transport in Hubei
Transport in Hunan
Transport in Guangdong